The Hackworth valve gear is a design of valve gear used to regulate the flow of steam to the pistons in steam engines. It is a radial gear, with an actuating lever driven from the crank. The drive may be taken directly from the crank or indirectly via a return crank (as in all pictures). The other end of the actuating lever is attached to a die block which slides in a slotted link. When the link is vertical, the engine is in mid-gear. Forward, reverse and cut-off adjustments are made by moving the link away from the vertical. The valve rod is pivoted to a point on the actuating lever.

History
The gear was patented by John Wesley Hackworth (1820-1891), son of Timothy Hackworth, in 1859.

Klug's valve gear
Hackworth valve gear was a precursor to Klug's valve gear, but it differs from the latter in that the eccentric rod's suspension point moves to-and-fro in a straight line by means of a die block sliding in a slotted guide.

See also
 Joy valve gear - a design used extensively on the L&YR and LNWR in England, and elsewhere.  A preserved example is LNWR G2a Class number 49395.
 Marshall valve gear - a modified Hackworth gear, patented in 1879 by Marshall, Sons & Co.
 Southern valve gear - Briefly popular in the United States around 1920. It combined elements of the Walschaerts and Baker patterns.

References

Locomotive valve gear
Valve gear